The 1968–69 Washington Huskies men's basketball team represented the University of Washington for the 1968–69 NCAA University Division basketball season. Led by first-year head coach Tex Winter, the Huskies were members of the Pacific-8 Conference and played their home games on campus at Hec Edmundson Pavilion in Seattle, Washington.

Winter was hired in March 1968; he had led Kansas State for the previous fifteen seasons, and the Wildcats were Big Eight champions in 1968.  He coached the Huskies for three seasons, then left for the NBA's

References

External links
Sports Reference – Washington Huskies: 1968–69 basketball season

Washington Huskies men's basketball seasons
Washington Huskies
Washington
Washington